Stephen Rhodes (born March 27, 1984) is an American stock car racing driver. A former competitor in the NASCAR Craftsman Truck Series, he is seeking to return to competition in the sport. When he made his debut in 2003, he became the first openly gay driver to compete in a NASCAR national touring series event.

Personal life
Rhodes was born in Goldsboro, North Carolina, where he attended Rosewood High School. Rhodes is openly gay. He came out at age seventeen, one year before he made his NASCAR Truck Series debut. He co-owned Brown Bag Cafe and Matchbox Restaurant & Bar in Goldsboro with his now ex-husband, Andy Mitchell. They were married in Manhattan on July 3, 2013. Rhodes currently resides in Raleigh, NC with his fiance Nathan Davis. They have a 2 year old beagle named Emmy.

Racing career
Rhodes began his racing career in 1992 at the age of eight. He started his career in go-kart racing, competing on dirt tracks before switching over to racing on asphalt-surfaced circuits. In 2001, Rhodes moved up to the NASCAR Late Model Stock Division at Southern National Raceway Park. In 2003, Rhodes competed in two Craftsman Truck Series races, driving the No. 66 Dodge Ram for MLB Motorsports; on March 23, four days before his 19th birthday, Rhodes made his Truck Series debut in the Lucas Oil 250 at Mesa Marin Raceway, where he started 33rd and finished 30th. On April 12, Rhodes competed in the Advance Auto Parts 250 at Martinsville Speedway, where he started 32nd and finished 21st. He finished 87th in the final season point standings.

Rhodes was the first openly gay driver to compete in NASCAR's national touring series. Rhodes later returned to the NASCAR Late Model Stock Division at SNRP, where he competed until 2010. In July 2013, Rhodes stated that he was seeking to return to full-time competition in the renamed Camping World Truck Series in 2014.

In popular media
Rhodes is featured in the cover story for the "Ride Review" issue of Lavender Magazine (March 19–April 1, 2015).

Motorsports career results

NASCAR
(key) (Bold – Pole position awarded by qualifying time. Italics – Pole position earned by points standings or practice time. * – Most laps led.)

Camping World Truck Series

 Season still in progress
 Ineligible for series points

See also
 List of lesbian, gay, bisexual, or transgender firsts by year
 List of LGBT sportspeople
 List of NASCAR drivers

References

External links
 

1984 births
Gay sportsmen
LGBT people from North Carolina
LGBT racing drivers
American LGBT sportspeople
Living people
NASCAR drivers
People from Goldsboro, North Carolina
Racing drivers from North Carolina
American sportsmen
21st-century LGBT people